Quest of Dungeons is a roguelike indie game released on March 25, 2014 by Portuguese developer Upfall Studios. The game features 16-bit graphics to resemble games from the Super NES and Sega Genesis era. It was initially released for Windows, Mac and iOS and was later ported to Xbox One via ID@Xbox on September 7, 2015. In February 2016, it was announced that the game was being developed on Wii U and Nintendo 3DS and was released on September 29, 2016. It was later released for PlayStation 4 on January 17, 2017. On August 2, 2017, it was announced that it would be coming to the Nintendo Switch.

Gameplay 

The player can assume the role of one of four different character class types, the Warrior, Wizard, Assassin or Shaman. The player enters a Mansion on the top floor and gradually progress down the increasing difficulty floors by leveling up.
The entire game is randomly generated, so monsters, traps, loot are never on the same place. The game world is placed in a tile-based square grid that is viewed from a top-down perspective, where the player, enemies, items and objects occupy discrete squares. The game is turn-based, and both the player and numerous enemies take turns performing actions. The game has a very fast approach to the turn-based mechanic, and while the player does have to wait for the enemies to take turn, everything is done very quickly to keep the action fluid. Each turn the player may move or attack monsters in adjacent squares, pick, drop, and use items, and interact with various in-game objects. Permanent death is a major part of the game, in which if the player dies by losing all HP it will restart from the beginning of the game, thus creating a different dungeon, there are no options inside the game to change this, so while the player can save and continue later at any moment, if he dies he can't continue.

Plot 

The game doesn't take itself very seriously and makes fun of the traditional plots. In this case, an Evil Dark Lord steals all the light in the world and traps it inside a magical lantern. The four heroes decide that it would be a good idea if one of them enters alone. This is a nod to B movie plots where sometimes characters make the most illogical decision.

Development 

According to the developer, development of the game started in June 2013. Initially planned as a tablet only game, it was ported to PC before initial release, after being approved via Steam Greenlight it was released on March 25, 2014. In the following months it was ported to Linux, Android and eventually Xbox One. The game was development using a in-house Game Engine.

Reception 

Critics have generally give the game good scores, especially the Xbox One version, considered the most polished and easy to pick version. While the desktop version was well received among players, it had mixed to positive reviews from critics, mostly because of the poorly devised Keyboard/Mouse controls that it had at launch.

TouchArcade gave it a 4/5 saying that "Quest of Dungeons is a very good roguelike and a fun game.". Softpedia gave it a 7/10 complementing on the solid gameplay, replayability and difficulty balance, but criticizing the lack of variety in the game. Pocket Gamer gave it a 6/10, and Nintendo Life gave the Wii U version a 8/10.

See also 
 List of roguelikes

References

External links
 Official website

2014 video games
Android (operating system) games
Flyhigh Works games
Indie video games
IOS games
Linux games
MacOS games
Nintendo 3DS games
Nintendo Switch games
PlayStation 4 games
Roguelike video games
Single-player video games
Video games developed in Portugal
Video games featuring female protagonists
Wii U eShop games
Windows games
Xbox One games